Nylonala is a monotypic snout moth genus described by László Anthony Gozmány in 1960. Its only species, Nylonala infidelis, described in the same article, is found in Egypt.

References

Moths described in 1960
Phycitinae
Monotypic moth genera
Moths of Africa